Sinatra and Strings is a 1962 album by Frank Sinatra consisting of standard ballads. It was arranged by Don Costa.

The album was the first that Sinatra recorded with Costa. They subsequently worked together on Cycles (1968), Some Nice Things I've Missed (1974) and Trilogy (1980). Charles L. Granata, in his 2003 book Sessions with Sinatra: Frank Sinatra and the Art of Recording felt the producer and mixing engineer of the album "chose to enhance the flat session tapes with just the right shower of reverberation, resulting in an appealingly glossy wet sound".

Costa subsequently felt that the album "was and always will be, the hallmark of my existence" and Sinatra's son, Frank Sinatra Jr., felt that the album with its large orchestra and "lush string sound" marked a new era in his father's recordings.

Track listing
"I Hadn't Anyone Till You" (Ray Noble) – 3:44
"Night and Day" (Cole Porter) – 3:37
"Misty" (Erroll Garner, Johnny Burke) – 2:41
"Stardust" (Hoagy Carmichael, Mitchell Parish) – 2:48
"Come Rain or Come Shine" (Harold Arlen, Johnny Mercer) – 4:06
"It Might as Well Be Spring" (Richard Rodgers, Oscar Hammerstein II) – 3:15
"Prisoner of Love" (Russ Columbo, Leo Robin, Clarence Gaskill) – 3:50
"That's All" (Bob Haymes, Alan Brandt) – 3:21
"All or Nothing at All" (Jack Lawrence, Arthur Altman) – 3:43
"Yesterdays" (Otto Harbach, Jerome Kern) – 3:45
 Bonus tracks included on the 1991 CD release:
"As You Desire Me" (Allie Wrubel) – 2:53
"Don't Take Your Love from Me" (Henry Nemo) – 4:05

Personnel
 Frank Sinatra - vocals
 Don Costa - arranger, conductor

References

1962 albums
Frank Sinatra albums
Reprise Records albums
Albums arranged by Don Costa
Albums conducted by Don Costa